Domenico Zaconti (1739 in Pescantina – 1816) was an Italian painter, born and mainly active in Verona. He was a pupil of the painter Marco Marcuola. He mainly painted sacred subjects.

Sources

1739 births
1816 deaths
Painters from Verona
18th-century Italian painters
Italian male painters
19th-century Italian painters
19th-century Italian male artists
18th-century Italian male artists